A special election was held in  on September 27 and October 4, 1806 to fill a vacancy left by the resignation of Joseph H. Nicholson (DR)

Election results

Lloyd took his seat in the 9th Congress on December 3, 1806, two days after the start of the 2nd session of the 9th Congress

See also
List of special elections to the United States House of Representatives

References

Maryland 1806 07
Maryland 1806 07
1806 07
Maryland 07
United States House of Representatives
United States House of Representatives 1806 07